Magnus Caris (born 15 November 1968) is a Swedish former professional darts player who competed in British Darts Organisation (BDO) and Professional Darts Corporation (PDC) events.

BDO career
Caris made seven BDO World Darts Championship appearances, his first coming in 1988, losing in the first round to Rick Ney of the United States. In 1990, he reached the quarter finals, beating Antero Rantala and Brian Cairns before losing to Eric Bristow.

He is famous for his semi final match in the 1994 BDO World Darts Championship against crowd favourite Bobby George. He defeated Wayne Weening, Leo Laurens and Martin Adams to set up a match with George who was struggling with a very bad back following his quarter final win over Kevin Kenny. Caris lost the first 2 sets against George, but then won the next 4 sets and went 2 legs up in the seventh set. In the third leg of the seventh set, Caris had one dart at double 18 to win the match with a 141 checkout. Following this, George won 9 legs in a row and prevailed 5–4 in sets.

Caris also played in the Winmau World Masters five times, with his best performance coming in 1992, reaching the semi finals with wins over John Lowe, Bristow and Martin Adams before losing to Mike Gregory. Caris returned to televised darts at the 2009 World Masters, losing to defending champion Martin Adams in the last 16.

PDC career

At the end of 2009, Caris competed in the 2010 PDC World Championship. He whitewashed Spain's Francisco Ruiz in the preliminary round before losing to Colin Lloyd in the first round.

In December 2010, Caris competed for Sweden in the inaugural PDC World Cup of Darts alongside Par Riihonen. Sweden beat Slovenia by 6 legs to 2 in the first round, but were defeated 6–4 by United States in the second round.

At the end of 2010, Caris qualified again for the 2011 PDC World Championship. He beat Austria's Dietmar Burger in the preliminary round 4–3, surviving several match darts against him, before losing to Mervyn King in the first round.

At the start of 2011, Caris competed in the PDC qualifying school and earned his 2011 PDC tour card by getting the semi-final on the second day of qualifying.

Caris qualified for the 2011 UK Open and beat Kevin McDine in the first round.  In the second round he was drawn against Peter Hudson and took a 3–0 lead before Hudson hit back to force a deciding leg, which Hudson won with a ten-darter. Caris also missed eight match darts including a bullseye for a 164 finish in the sixth leg.

Caris qualified for the 2011 Grand Slam of Darts after reaching the final of the Wildcard qualifier. He finished 3rd in his group with one victory and two defeats.

At the 2012 World Championship he let a 2–0 lead slip against Steve Beaton in the first round. Caris had three darts to wrap up a straight sets victory, but seemingly let the boisterous crowd get to him, and eventually lost the match, 2–3. 
He represented Sweden with Dennis Nilsson once again in the 2012 PDC World Cup of Darts and together they were beaten 1–3 by Belgium in the second round, having defeated Japan in round 1. In June, Caris earned a place in the European Tour Event 2 in Berlin by defeating Roger Palmen and Christian Gödl in the European Qualifier. In the first round he lost to Terry Jenkins 3–6. He also qualified for the third European Tour Event with a win over Mareno Michels, but was then beaten by James Wade 3–6 in the first round in Düsseldorf. At the European Championship, Caris lost in the first round to Phil Taylor 3–6 with an average of 90.

Caris finished 2012 sixth on the European Order of Merit which qualified him for the 2013 World Championship, as he took the second of four spots that were available for the highest non-qualified players. He played Robert Thornton in the first round and lost 0–3 in sets, winning just a single leg during the match. He was ranked world number 44 after the tournament. Caris played in his third World Cup of Darts and second with Par Riihonen in February 2013, but they finished bottom of Group C, losing to Canada 4–5 and Scotland 2–5.

Caris produced a very good run in the fourth UK Open Qualifier of the year by reaching the quarter-finals, beating Simon Whitlock and Andy Smith, before losing to Jamie Caven. He lost 5–1 to Kirk Shepherd in the second round of the UK Open itself. He won two events on the Scandinavian Pro Tour during the year to finish third on their Order of Merit.

In March 2014, Caris reached the semi-finals of the fourth Players Championship, only the second time he has done so in his PDC career. He beat Nigel Heydon, Peter Hudson, Justin Pipe, Adam Hunt and Stephen Bunting, before losing 6–4 to Ian White. In the World Cup of Darts, Caris and his playing partner Peter Sajwani lost both their singles games in the second round against Scotland's Peter Wright and Robert Thornton to exit the tournament. Caris lost in the final of the European Championship Qualifier 6–4 to Robert Wagner.

Caris claimed a new two-year PDC Tour Card in January 2015 by coming through the fourth day of Q School. He began the year brightly by reaching the quarter-finals of the first Players Championship event, losing 6–5 to James Wade. Caris lost in two finals on the Scandinavian Pro Tour, but won the first Russian event with a 6–3 victory over Per Laursen. He also took the SDC qualifier for the European Championship, where he was eliminated 6–2 by Simon Whitlock in the opening round.

Caris lost in the final of two Scandinavian Tour events in the early part of 2016. He reached the third round of the UK Open for the first time and lost 9–4 to John Henderson. Caris and Daniel Larsson were defeated 5–2 by Denmark in the first round of the World Cup. He won the final Scandinavian Tour event of the year by seeing off Cor Dekker 6–4. In the first round of the 2017 World Championship, Caris missed one set dart to level his first round match with Adrian Lewis at 1–1 and was beaten 3–0.

At the 2017 Gibraltar Darts Trophy, Caris overcame Dyson Parody 6–1, Jelle Klaasen 6–3 and Benito van de Pas 6–2 to reach his first European Tour quarter-final and he was beaten 6–3 by Mensur Suljović.

He announced his intention to retire from professional darts after the 2019 World Cup of Darts.

On 08/06/19 he played his final match as a professional darts player at the 2019 World Cup of Darts where he lost his match 4–0 to Gary Anderson. His partner then went on to lose meaning his team lost 2–0 to Team Scotland, Peter Wright and Gary Anderson. Following this match he officially retired from darts.

World Championship results

BDO
 1988: First round (lost to Rick Ney 1–3)
 1989: Second round (lost to Mike Gregory 0–3)
 1990: Quarter-finals (lost to Eric Bristow 1–4)
 1991: First round (lost to Dennis Priestley 0–3)
 1992: First round (lost to Phil Taylor 1–3)
 1994: Semi-finals (lost to Bobby George 4–5)
 1995: First round (lost to Kevin Painter 2–3)

PDC
 2010: First round (lost to Colin Lloyd 1–3)
 2011: First round (lost to Mervyn King 0–3)
 2012: First round (lost to Steve Beaton 2–3)
 2013: First round (lost to Robert Thornton 0–3)
 2017: First round (lost to Adrian Lewis 0–3)

Performance timeline

References

External links

Swedish darts players
1968 births
Living people
British Darts Organisation players
Professional Darts Corporation former tour card holders
Sportspeople from Stockholm
PDC World Cup of Darts Swedish team